The Set is an Australian live music television program that airs on ABC. It is hosted by Linda Marigliano and Dylan Alcott. The show features performances from guest artists and is filmed in front of a live audience, designed to reflect a house party environment.

The program premiered on Wednesday 31 October 2018 at 9:30pm, in an initial 4-episode series.

The program returned for a second series in 2019, commencing on Wednesday 28 August. A third season of the show was aired in 2021 on Saturday 24 April.

Episodes

Series 1 (2018)

Series 2 (2019)

References

External links
 
 

Australian Broadcasting Corporation original programming
2018 Australian television series debuts
Australian music television series
English-language television shows